The Royal and Conciliar San Carlos Seminary is the archdiocesan seminary of the Roman Catholic Archdiocese of Manila. It was established in the year 1702, by decree of King Philip V of Spain. At present, the institution houses seminarians belonging to various dioceses in Luzon, particularly from the Metro Manila region.

Priest-formators of San Carlos Seminary 
There are twelve priests of the Archdiocese of Manila that cater to the formation program of seminarians since the School Year 2017–2018.

 Very Rev. Fr. Joselito Martin
 Rector

 Rev. Fr. Cesar Buhat
 Procurator
 Spiritual Director, Theology Department

 Rev. Fr. Edwin Mercado
 Director, Theology Department

 Rev. Fr. Kristoffer Habal
 Director, Philosophy Department
 Admissions Director

 Rev. Fr. Godwin Tatlonghari
 Director, Pre-College Department
 Liturgy Director

 Rev. Fr. Jaime Vidal Zuñiga
 Assistant Director, Pre-College Department

 Rev. Fr. Ramon Jade Licuanan
 Director, Pastoral-Spiritual Integration Year

 Rev. Fr. Enrico Emmanuel Ayo
 Academic Dean, San Carlos Graduate School of Theology
 Director, Archbishop Gabriel M. Reyes Memorial Library

 Rev. Fr. Isidro Marinay
 Academic Dean, Philosophy Department

 Rev. Fr. Rolando Garcia, Jr.
 Spiritual Director, Philosophy Department

 Rev. Fr. Celestino Pascual
 Resident Confessor and Spiritual Director

 Rev. Fr. Jose Francisco Syquia
 Head, Human Formation

History 

San Carlos Seminary was the first diocesan seminary established in the Philippines. In 1562, the Council of Trent decreed that every bishop should establish in his diocese a center of clerical education which would serve as a seedbed of the diocesan clergy.

In 1581, Domingo Salazar, OP, the first Bishop of Manila decreed the establishment of a seminary to prepare native men for the priesthood and ecclesiastical dignities. Despite several attempts, his dream crystallized only after a century and a quarter had passed; both Church and the State did what the poverty of the colony and other adverse circumstances would allow as a provisional solution. Colleges where ecclesiastical and religious native vocations might be fostered were founded, from the beginnings of the 17th century onwards: the Jesuits' Colegio de San José (1601), Colegio de Santo Tomás (1611) of the Dominicans, Colegio de San Juan de Letrán and Colegio de San Pedro y San Pablo (1632). Although these schools fostered training for future priests, a diocesan seminary was still needed.

Early centuries in Manila 
In 1592, the King enjoined that the pertinent decree of Trent be implemented in the Indies. He ordered all archbishops and bishops of the Indies to found and support seminaries decreed by the Council of Trent for the formation of a local (native) clergy.

Since the Philippines was then under the “Patronato Real” system, on April 28, 1702, King ordered the establishment of a seminary in Manila for eight seminarians. However, this plan was modified by Abbe Giovanni Battista Sidoti, an Italian priest accompanying Archbishop Charles Thomas Maillard de Tournon, papal legate to Peking, on the way to China. He worked for the erection in Manila of an Asian regional seminary for seventy-two seminarians of the Far East, with the approval of Archbishop Diego Camacho y Ávila. The seminary was named Real Colegio Seminario de San Clemente in honor of Pope Clement XI. Having learned of the development, the King ordered the closure and demolition of the seminary building, the execution of his original plan, and the transfer of Archbishop Camacho to Mexico.

From 1702 to 1730, seminarians took their courses of philosophy and theology at the Colegio de San Jose and Colegio de Santo Tomas. The number of seminarians increased several times.

On December 8, 1707, Archbishop Francisco de la Cuesta, O.S.H., Camacho's successor, opened the seminary. In 1715, he renamed the seminary to Real Seminario de San Felipe in honor of the King's patron saint. It was located in front of the Archbishop's Palace in Intramuros.

In 1728, Archbishop Carlos Bermúdez de Castro had a dispute with the governor-general over his right to nominate professors in San Felipe. He argued that the seminary was an ecclesiastical institution to be administered by the archbishop in conformity with the decrees of the Council of Trent and the laws of the Indies. His successor, Archbishop Juan Angel Rodríguez, continued de Castro's fight over the archbishop's right to guide the seminary. However, the civil authorities, under the pretext of Patronato Real, rebuffed them.

The impetus for a review of how the “Patronato Real” administered the seminary came when Bishop Miguel Lino de Espeleta of Cebu became acting governor-general of the Philippines from 1759 to 1761. He insisted that the royal treasury pay its obligations to the seminary which amounted to 54,000 pesos from 1705 to 1759. The royal treasury had committed 1,200 pesos for the yearly maintenance of the seminary. Hence, during the fifty-four years of the seminary, the royal contribution to the seminary averaged only 200 pesos a year.

The British invasion in 1762 dispersed the seminarians. It was only on January 25, 1768, that the seminary was re-opened by Archbishop Basílio Sancho de Santa Justa y Rufina, naming it Colegio Seminario Ecclesiástico de Manila. It was placed under the royal patronage of King Charles II. On November 16, 1778, the King ordered a visitation of the seminary. As a result, reforms were instituted, and the magnificent buildings of the expelled Jesuits, the Church and Colegio de San Ignacio were assigned to the diocesan seminary. For some thirty years (1784–1817), the Colegio de San José and the diocesan seminary, which began to be called in 1786 as Real Seminario Conciliar de San Carlos in honor of the King, existed side by side. San Carlos was located from 1784 to 1880 on Calle Real de Palacio (now General Luna Street) and Calle Escuela (now Victoria Street).

The Congregation of the Mission (C.M.), familiarly known as Vincentian Fathers, took charge over the seminary on August 2, 1862, under the patronage of Queen Isabella II and with the support of Archbishop Gregorio Melitón Martínez de Santa Cruz. Gregorio Velasco became the first Vincentian Rector of the conciliar Seminary.

Earthquakes in 1852, 1863, 1880, and 2013 damaged the Church of San Ignacio and the seminary building itself. Following the last earthquake, the Vincentians temporarily moved their charges to their Casa del Ocampo at 959 Calle San Marcelino (1880–1883).

In 1883, Archbishop Pedro Payo, O.P. constructed a new seminary building between the new Jesuit church of San Ignacio and the Archbishop's property on Calle Arzobispo. The building was rented in 1925 by Ateneo de Manila and was called Patio de San Javier. At present, it is the quarters for the employees of the Intramuros guest house of the archdiocese.

In 1897, the seminary moved to a new building built under the direction of Archbishop Bernardino Nozaleda. It occupied a whole block bordered by Beaterio, Anda, and Real de Palacio (Gen. Luna) Streets. The seminary stayed in this building for only a year (1897–1898). With the outbreak of the Philippine Revolution, the Archbishop ordered its closure. The building, for a while leased by the Americans, became known as Saint Paul's Hospital, under the charge of Saint Paul de Chartres Sisters and later the Maryknoll Sisters.

Between the years 1900–1911, the seminary existed in an old building along Calle Arzobispo beside the new San Ignacio Church. On May 20, 1905, the administration of the seminary was turned over by the American Archbishop Jeremiah Harty to the Jesuits. This arrangement under the Jesuits lasted for only six years until August 17, 1911. In the next two years, San Carlos was fused with Seminario de San Javier (the name given by the Jesuits, upon their return to the Philippines, to Colegio de San José) on Padre Faura Street in Ermita. The few seminarians then went to San Javier for their studies until 1913, when San Javier was closed.

Years in Mandaluyong 
For economic reasons, on May 19, 1913, Archbishop Harty decided to transfer seminarians to a renovated building in the then town of Mandaluyong, which was constructed by the Augustinians in 1716 and had been abandoned since around 1900. In June 1913, the Vincentians were again put in charge of the seminary. The seminary's name in honor of San Carlos Borromeo was by then definite.

In 1927, to separate the major seminarians from the minor seminarians, San Carlos was again housed at Casa de Ocampo along San Marcelino (in the campus of Adamson University). In 1936, due to the construction of a new building in San Marcelino, the major seminarians joined the minor seminarians in Mandaluyong. The following years, San Carlos Seminary returned to San Marcelino in the newly constructed Central House of the Vincentian Fathers. In 1941, the major and minor seminarians were reunited under one campus in Mandaluyong. In December, the Second World War caused the closure of the campus, only to be reopened in 1946. But there were a huge number of enrollees that steps were taken in the postwar years.

Move to Makati 
In 1916, Archbishop Harty was succeeded by Archbishop Michael O'Doherty, who reigned until 1949. Cebu Archbishop Gabriel M. Reyes, who became the first Filipino Archbishop of Manila in 1949, planned and ordered the construction of the new San Carlos Seminary at Makati to accommodate the huge number of seminary students. In 1951, he blessed the cornerstone for the new building of San Carlos Seminary in Guadalupe Viejo village along Highway 54 (now Epifanio de los Santos Avenue or EDSA). On January 24, 1953, Thomas Norman Cardinal Gilroy, Archbishop of Sydney and papal legate to the First Plenary Council of the Philippines, blessed the new building. The Manila seminarians and professors transferred from Mandaluyong to the new San Carlos Seminary to begin the school year 1953–1954. The new seminary building was constructed to house the major and minor seminarians of the Archdiocese of Manila (Rizal, Cavite and Bulacan and Laguna were still included). The right wing would be occupied by the minor seminarians and the left wing by the major seminarians. In the middle of the building is the common chapel and in the basement, the refectory.

In 1951, the Congregation of the Immaculate Heart of Mary (C.I.C.M., known as the Belgian or Scheut Fathers) had been asked by Rome to take up the formation of the seminarians in Lipa, where Bishop Rufino J. Santos, D.D., (later Archbishop of Manila in 1953 and the first Filipino cardinal in 1960) was then the administrator of the diocese. On June 10, 1953, it was announced that the C.I.C.M. Fathers would take over San Carlos Seminary from the Vincentians, and with that San Carlos student body included the major seminarians (theology and philosophy) of Lipa, which were transferred to Makati. The transfer took place on the June 15 and 16 and on June 25, the new school year began with the Mass of the Holy Spirit.

In 1955, the minor seminarians were then separated from the philosophy and theology seminarians of San Carlos Seminary. They transferred to the newly erected minor seminary under the name of Our Lady of Guadalupe Minor Seminary, which was blessed on August 22, 1955. It was located a block away from San Carlos Seminary in the direction of the Pasig River, near the present day Guadalupe MRT station. In 1973, Cardinal Santos turned over the seminary administration from the C.I.C.M. Fathers to the diocesan priests led by Rev. Fr. Oscar V. Cruz, who later became Auxiliary Bishop of Manila in 1976.

The construction of the new building of the San Carlos Graduate School of Theology and the Archbishop Gabriel M. Reyes Memorial Library began in 1985, and they were completed and blessed by Cardinal Sin and Cebu Archbishop Ricardo Cardinal Vidal on June 29, 1987. In that same year, the two-winged edifice for the Holy Apostles Senior Seminary (HASS) and the San Lorenzo Ruiz Lay Formation Center (or LayForce) was constructed. The Lorenzo Mission Institute (LMI), aimed at forming priestly candidates for the missions to the Chinese communities was built in 1989. In 1990, Bahay-Pari, a house for priests, was put up for the ongoing formation, physical rest and spiritual rejuvenation for the Manila clergy. On March 13, 1995, the cornerstone of Holy Apostles Senior Seminary was laid to give way to the full-swing formation of the laity at the Layforce Building.

When Bishop Luis Antonio G. Tagle became Archbishop of Manila in 2011, he continued the vision of his predecessor Cardinal Rosales, to uplift and deepen the formation program of the seminarians through regular pastoral and theological updating and strengthening the seminary's thrust in human formation of the seminarians.

Some of the historic events that took place in San Carlos Seminary were the following: the Second Plenary Council of the Philippines (January 20 to February 17, 1991); the Sixth Plenary Assembly of the Federation of Asian Bishops' Conferences (January 10–19, 1995); the visit of Pope John Paul II (January 15, 1995); the National Pastoral Consultation on Church Renewal (January 20–27, 2001); and the Second National Rural Congress (July 7–8, 2008).

Through the years, the seminary has produced many dedicated and zealous men who have served for the mission of the Church. Some of San Carlos Seminary's distinguished alumni are Gomburza priests Mariano Gómez and Jacinto Zamora, priest-martyrs executed by the Spanish government for supposed involvement in the 1872 Cavite Mutiny and thus inspired the Revolution; Cardinal Rufino Santos; AND Ricardo Vidal, Cardinal Archbishop of Cebu.

The seminary is considered a national architectural heritage, since its architect during the building construction of 1951 to 1952 is Juan Nakpil, National Artist for Architecture.

Filipino Rectors of San Carlos Seminary 

 Oscar V. Cruz, D.D. † (1973 to 1978), Archbishop-emeritus of Lingayen-Dagupan
 Protacio Gungon, D.D. † (1978 to 1980), Bishop-emeritus of Antipolo
 Gaudencio Cardinal Rosales, D.D. (1980 to 1982), Archbishop-emeritus of Manila
 Ramon Arguelles, D.D. (1982 to 1986), Archbishop-emeritus of Lipa
 Francisco De Leon, D.D. (1986 to 1991), presently the Bishop of Antipolo
 Crisostomo Yalung, D.D (1991 to 1994), Bishop-emeritus of Antipolo
 Msgr. Allen Aganon, PC, MA (1994 to 1998), presently the Vicar-General of the Diocese of Parañaque and Parish Priest of San Isidro Labrador Parish, Veraville Homes 1, Almanza Uno, Las Piñas
 Francisco De Leon, D.D. (1998 to 2001), presently the Bishop of Antipolo
 Msgr. Jesus-Romulo Rañada, PC, Ph.D., STh.D (2001 to 2002), presently the Vicar-General for Administration of the Diocese of Novaliches and the Parish Priest and Rector of Saint Paul Parish and Diocesan Shrine for New Evangelization (Santuario di San Paolo), Casa Milan, Barangay Greater Lagro, Quezon City)
 Fr. Edwin Mercado, STL (2002 to 2008), presently the Theology Director of San Carlos Seminary
 Msgr. Hernando Coronel, PC, MBA, MA, MPA (2008–2015), presently the Parish Priest and Rector of the Minor Basilica of the Black Nazarene and Saint John the Baptist Parish, Quiapo, Manila
 Fr. Joselito Martin (2015–present)

Priestly formation program of San Carlos Seminary 
Being the only diocesan-run seminary in Metro Manila with a dual status of house of formation and house of studies (offering civil degrees in theology and philosophy, recognized and accredited by the Commission on Higher Education as with other colleges and universities), San Carlos Seminary provides updated holistic priestly formation for the dioceses of Metro Manila, as well as in other parts of the country and abroad, for as long as seminarians are recommended by their respective local ordinary.

A young man is accepted after rigorous screening. A high school diploma and baptismal certificate are the minimum requirements, yet standards of intelligence and psychological maturity must also be met. The priestly formation is holistic. The seminary organizes its programs of formation under five main aspects coined as CHIPS: Community, Human, Intellectual, Pastoral, and Spiritual Formation.

Stages of priestly formation 
The seminary formation comprises three stages: Pre-College, Philosophy, and Theology.

Propaedeutic Stage (Pre-College Department) 

 Fresh high school graduates, college undergraduates and graduates, who are no more than 22 years of age, undergo this one-year period of rigid seminary orientation. They learn the rubrics of prayer life, community living, study habits, and personal growth. This stage was used to be called the Juniorate Department because from 1990 to 2005, it housed both the Formation Year seminarians and the First Year Philosophy seminarians. With the adoption of the K-12 curriculum, a senior high school wing was added.

Directors of the Pre-College Department  
 1979–1982 Most Rev. Jesse Mercado, STh.L (Diocese of Parañaque)
 1982–1985 Msgr. Jesus-Norriel Bandojo, PC
 1985–1987 Fr. Lazaro Abaco
 1987–1988 Fr. Francisco Siguan, MA (Diocese of Parañaque)
 1988–1993 Msgr. Jesus-Norriel Bandojo, PC
 1993–1995 Fr. Raymond Joseph Arre, STh.L (Diocese of Cubao)
 1995–1999 Fr. Leandro Magnait, STB (Diocese of Kalookan)
 1999–2002 Fr. Jose Peregrino Tomas (Diocese of Novaliches)
 2002–2007 Fr. Carlo Magno Marcelo
 2007–2014 Fr. Jose Francisco Syquia, MA, STh.L
 2014-2015 Fr. Kristoffer Habal
 2015-present Fr. Godwin Tatlonghari

Discipleship Stage (Philosophy Department) 

 Seminarians admitted to the First Year are only those coming from the Formation Year Department (or pre-college from other seminaries) and graduates of the minor seminary. During the four years of this stage, the seminarian is equipped with academic knowledge for critical thinking and understanding of matters of faith and morality, a profound sense of spirituality and community living, and grounding in pastoral activities.
 The Philosophy curriculum is compliant with the provisions of the Commission on Higher Education of the Department of Education. Seminarians who complete the academic requirements are granted the Bachelor of Arts (A.B.) Degree in Philosophy, Major in Classical Philosophy.
 The role of the Director can be equated with the term Prefect or Dean of Seminarians.

Directors of the Philosophy Department 
 1974–1976 Most Rev. Oscar V. Cruz, D.D. (Archdiocese of Lingayen-Dagupan)
 1976–1978 Msgr. Severino Anatalio, HP, JCD
 1978–1979 Most Rev. Francisco De Leon, DD (Diocese of Antipolo)
 1979 Fr. Miguel Ilagan
 1979–1980 Most Rev. Jesse Mercado, DD (Diocese of Parañaque)
 1980–1984 Msgr. Emmanuel Sunga, PC, MA, STh.L
 1984–1985 Msgr. Jesus-Norriel Bandojo, PC
 1985–1986 Msgr. Ramon Tirania, HP, STL (†) (Diocese of Bacolod)
 1986–1987 Fr. Lazaro Abaco
 1987–1989 Fr. Roberto Reyes, Ph.L (Diocese of Cubao)
 1989–1992 Fr. Melchor Montalbo, Ph.D (Diocese of Parañaque)
 1992–1993 Fr. Benito Tuazon, MS
 1993–1997 Msgr. Alex Amandy, HP, JCD (Diocese of Kalookan)
 1997–1998 Fr. Raymond Joseph Arre, STh.L (Diocese of Cubao)
 1998–2001 Fr. Lorenz Moises Festin, Ph.D
 2001–2003 Fr. Ferdinand Santos, Ph.D, STh.L (Archdiocese of Miami - Florida, USA)
 2003–2005 Fr. Jason Laguerta, Ph.D
 2005–2015 Fr. Rey Anthony Yatco
 2015-present Fr. Kristoffer Habal

Academic Deans of the Philosophy Department 
 1977–1979 Most Rev. Francisco De Leon, DD (Diocese of Antipolo)
 1979–1980 Fr. Feliciano Manalili, OCSO
 1980–1985 Msgr. Emmanuel Sunga, PC, STh.L
 1985–1987 Fr. Gerardo Giovanni Tapiador, SSL (Diocese of Novaliches)
 1987–1994 Fr. Melchor Montalbo, Ph.D (Diocese of Parañaque)
 1994–1995 Fr. Leandro Magnait (Diocese of Kalookan)
 1995–1996 Fr. Melchor Montalbo, Ph.D (Diocese of Parañaque)
 1996–1997 Fr. Henry Ferreras, STh.L (Diocese of Cubao)
 1997–1998 Msgr. Dennis S. Odiver, PC, Ph.L, ST.B
 1998–2015, Fr. Lorenz Moises Festin, Ph.D
 2015–present Fr. Isidro Marinay, Ph.D

Configuration Stage (Theology Department) 

 At this stage, the seminarian is formed to be a pastoral theologian in fulfillment of the demands of the Church for his future ministry. He should exemplify traits of a responsible shepherd and conscious leader.
 There are five years allotted for the theological formation of a seminarian: 4 for the course proper and 1 for the PSIY. Between his Second Year and Third Year, he undergoes the Pastoral-Spiritual Integration Year (or PSIY) wherein he begins to discern seriously his vocation to the priesthood through lengthy activities of pastoral outreach, community building, and prayerful discernment.
 In the absence of the Seminary Rector, the Director of the Theology Department assumes the responsibilities of this post. In the past, there was a Vice-Rector who would assist in the key administration of the seminary. The last vice-rector, Rev. Fr. Estelito Villegas, was installed parish priest of Saints Peter and Paul Parish in Poblacion, Makati in January 2007, upon the request of the seminary fathers to cater the need for a seminary parish for the ongoing formation of seminarians.
 Seminarians who would complete the course requirements will be granted a Master's Degree in either Theology (thesis program), Pastoral Ministry (non-thesis), or Spirituality.
 The role of the Director can be equated with the term Prefect or Dean of Seminarians.

Directors of the Theology Department 
 1974–1978 Msgr. Sabino Vengco, HP, STD (Diocese of Malolos)
 1978–1979 Fr. Feliciano Manalili, OCSO
 1989-1981 Most Rev. Francisco De Leon, DD (Diocese of Antipolo)
 1981–1985 Msgr. Sabino Vengco, HP, STD (Diocese of Malolos)
 1985–1987 Fr. Edwin Agapay, STh.L (†) (Prelature of Infanta)
 1987–1993 Fr. Edwin Mercado, STh.L
 1993–1998 Fr. Mario Sanchez, SLL (Diocese of Novaliches)
 1998–2000 Msgr. Nestor Cerbo, PC, STh.D
 2000-2001 Fr. Gregory Ramon Gaston, STh.D
 2001-2002 Fr. Ramil Marcos, MA, STh.L (Diocese of Pasig)
 2002–2007 Fr. Joselito Martin
 2007–2015, Fr. Carlo Magno Marcelo
 2015-present Fr. Edwin Mercado

Academic Deans of the San Carlos Graduate School of Theology 
 1978–1982 Msgr. Sabino Vengco, HP, STh.D (Diocese of Malolos)
 1982–1983 Most Rev. Teodoro Bacani, STh.D, D.D. (Diocese of Novaliches)
 1973–1985 Msgr. Sabino Vengco, HP, STh.D (Diocese of Malolos)
 1985–1987 Fr. Edwin Agapay, STh.L (†) (Prelature of Infanta)
 1987–1989 Fr. Gerardo Giovanni Tapiador, SSL (Diocese of Novaliches)
 1989–1992 Msgr. Gerardo Santos, PC, STM, Ed.D
 1992–1997 Most Rev. Ruperto Santos, STh.L (Diocese of Balanga)
 1997–1998 Fr. Henry Ferreras, STh.L (Diocese of Cubao)
 1998–2002 Fr. Gregory Ramon Gaston, STh.D
 2002-2006 Fr. Nolan Que, Ph.D
 2006–2015, Fr. Joel Jason, MA, STh.L
 2015-present Fr. Enrico Emmanuel Ayo

 Directors of the Pastoral-Spiritual Integration Year 
 1992–1993 Fr. Celestino Pascual, STh.L
 1993–1994 Msgr. Allen Aganon, PC, MA (Diocese of Parañaque)
 1994–2000 Fr. Ronald Macale (Diocese of Cubao)
 2000–2007 Fr. Estelito Villegas
 2007–2015, Fr. Joselito Martin
 2015-present, Fr. Ramon Jade Licuanan

 Professors of the Pre-college and College Department (1974-2011) Manila Diocesan PriestsFR. LAZARO ABACO
Religious Education and Psychology (SY 1984–1985 until 1986–1987)
Spiritual Growth (SY 1985–1986, 1986–1987)

MSGR. SEVERINO ANATALIO, HP, JCD
Latin (SY 1976–1977, 1977–1978)
Religious Education (SY 1977–1978)

FR. MAXELL LOWELL ARANILLA, PhD
Metaphysics, Theodicy (SY 2003–2004 to present)
Philosophy of Education, Epistemology (SY 2004–2005 to present)

MSGR. JESUS-NORRIEL BANDOJO, PC
Christian Formation (SY 1983–1984)
Methodology, Urbanity, Special Latin (SY 1984–1985)
College Theology (SY 1989–1990 to SY 1992–1993)
Fundamental Values, Spirituality and Growth, Seminary Formation (SY 1989–1990, 1990–1991)
Prayer Basics and Christian Spirituality (SY 1991–1992 and 1992–1993)
Human and Christian Values, Group Processing (SY 1993–1994)

FR. JOSELITO BUENAFE, STh.L
Social Doctrines of the Church (SY 2007–2008 to present)
Basic Faith Catechism (SY 2008–2009 to present)

MSGR. NESTOR CERBO, PC, STh.D
Christian Maturity and Living, Seminary Formation (SY 1992–1993, 1993–1994)

FR. EDGARDO COROZA
Latin (SY 2000–2001)

FR. EDGARDO DEVIÑA
Cosmology (SY 1995–1996)
Christian Maturity, Logic (SY 1999–2000)

FR. GENARO DIWA, SLL
Solfeggio (SY 1995–1996, 1996–1997)
Latin (SY 1996–1997, 1997–1998)

FR. LORENZ MOISES J. FESTIN, PhD
Introduction to Philosophy (SY 2004–2005 to present)
Metaphysics (SY 1999–2000 to 2001–2002)
Moral Philosophy, Social Philosophy, Cosmology, (SY 1998–1999 to present)
Modern Philosophy (SY 1998–1999 to 2009–2010)
Contemporary Philosophy (SY 1998–1999 to 2008–2009)
Thesis Writing and Seminar (SY 2008–2009 to present)
Philosophical Synthesis (SY 2002–2003 to present)

FR. ALBERT CECILIO FLORES, STh.D cand.
Latin (SY 2006–2007 to present)

FR. ROLANDO GARCIA JR., STh.L units
Introduction to the Sacred Scriptures (SY 2007–2008 to 2009–2010)
Seminary Study Habits (SY 2008–2009, 2009–2010)
Challenges of the Philippine Church Today (SY 2008–2009)

FR. GREGORY RAMON GASTON, STh.D
Latin (SY 1997–1998)
Christian Values (SY 2002–2003)

FR. GENEROSO GERONIMO
Latin (SY 1995–1996)
Catholic Doctrines (SY 1995–1996 to 1997–1998, 1999–2000, 2001–2002)
Christian Spirituality (SY 1998–1999, 2001–2002)
Christian Living, Human Formation (SY 1999–2000, 2000–2001)
Prayer Basics, Self-Discovery (SY 2001–2002)
Liturgy – Altar Serving (SY 2006–2007)
College Theology (SY 1995–1996, 2001–2002, 2002–2003)
Social Doctrines of the Church (SY 2000–2001)

MSGR. NORBERTO HABOS, PC
Latin (SY 2005–2006)

FR. YULITO Q. IGNACIO, STh.L
College Theology (SY 1998–1999)
Spirituality (SY 2002–2003, 2003–2004)

FR. JASON LAGUERTA, MA
Latin (SY 2000–2001 to 2010–2011)
Social Psychology (SY 2006–2007 to 2010–2011)
NSTP-LTS (SY 2002–2003 to 2010–2011)
Religious Education (SY 2003–2004 to 2010–2011)
Social Doctrines of the Church (SY 2003–2004 to 2006–2007)

MSGR. ESTEBAN LO, PC, LRMS
Oriental Philosophy (SY 1996–1997, 1997–1998)
History of Filipino-Chinese Apostolate, History of Christianity in China (SY 2002–2003 to 2004–2005)

FR. REX MAGALLANES
Liturgical Music (SY 1979–1980)
Catechetics (SY 1980–1981)

FR. REGINALD MALICDEM
Thesis Writing and Seminar (SY 2005–2006 to 2007–2008)

FR. LEO NILO MANGUSSAD, BM
Music (SY 1988–1989 to 1995–1996, 1997–1998 to 1999–2000, 2003–2004, 2004–2005)

FR. CARLO MAGNO MARCELO
Salvation History (SY 1997–1998, 2003–2004 to 2005–2006)
Christian Values, Basic Faith Catechism (SY 2002–2003 to 2006–2007)
Liturgical Music (SY 2002–2003 to present)
Seminary Study Habits (SY 2007–2008)
Christian Values (SY 2002–2003 to 2006–2007)

FR. EDWIN MERCADO, STh.L
The Church Renewed (SY 2005–2006, 2006–2007)
Challenges of the Philippine Church Today (SY 2007–2008)

MSGR. DENNIS ODIVER, PC, Ph.L, STB
Moral Philosophy, Social Philosophy, Social Doctrines of the Church (SY 1997–1998)

FR. GABRIEL PARAAN
Latin (SY 1998–1999)

FR. CELESTINO V. PASCUAL, STh.L
College Theology (SY 1987–1988 to 1990–1991)

MSGR. AUGUSTO PEDROSA, HP, MA
Contemporary Economic Problems (SY 1975–1976)

MSGR. GERARDO O. SANTOS, PC, STM, Ed.D.
Religious Education (SY 1989–1990 to 1991–1992)

FR. RUFINO SESCON JR.
Christian Maturity and Living (SY 2001–2002)
Church History (SY 2005–2006 to present)
Catholic Doctrines (SY 2002–2003, 2003–2004)
Basic Faith Catechism (SY 2005–2006)
Religious Education (SY 2004–2005)

FR. ESTANISLAO SORIA, MS (†)
College Theology (SY 1987–1988)

MSGR. EMMANUEL V. SUNGA, PC, STh.L, MA
Liturgical Music (SY 1979–1980 to 1984–1985)
Latin, Physical Education (SY 1980–1981 to 1984–1985)
Philippine History (SY 1982–1983 to 1984–1985)

FR. JOSE FRANCISCO SYQUIA, STh.L, MA
Seminary Formation (SY 2007–2008 to present)
Spirituality (SY 2005–2006 to 2006–2007)
Basic Faith Catechism (SY 2006–2007)
Social Psychology (SY 2005–2006)
Christian Values (SY 2004–2005)

FR. BENITO TUAZON, BS
Physics (SY 1992–1993, 1993–1994)
College Theology (SY 1993–1994, 1997–1998)
Christian Existence, Basic Orientation, Prayer Basics (SY 1997–1998)

FR. ESTELITO VILLEGAS
Liturgy (SY 2002–2003 to 2009–2010)
Hagiography (SY 2005–2006 to 2009–2010)
Practical Arts (SY 2005–2006)

FR. REY ANTHONY YATCO
College Theology (SY 2003–2004 to present)
Hagiography (SY 2010–2011)
Introduction to Sacred Scriptures (SY 2003–2004 to 2006–2007)
Seminary Study Habits (SY 2010–2011)
Liturgy (SY 2010–2011)
Spirituality (SY 2004–2005)

FR. JOSE VIDAMOR YU, LRMS, D.Miss
Oriental Philosophy (SY 2000–2001 to present)
Philosophy of Religion (SY 2004–2005 to present)Non-Manila Diocesan PriestsMSGR. ALLEN AGANON, PC, MA (Diocese of Parañaque)
Filipino Psychology (SY 1986–1987)
Religious Education (SY 1992–1993)
College Theology (SY 1993–1994)
Cosmology (SY 1995–1996)
Latin (FY – SY 1997–1998)

FR. ROLANDO AGUSTIN (Diocese of Parañaque)
Latin (SY 1995–1996 to 1999–2000)

MSGR. ALEX AMANDY, HP, JCD (Diocese of Kalookan)
Latin (SY 1993–1994 to 1996–1997)

FR. RAYMOND JOSEPH ARRE, STh.B (Diocese of Cubao)
Bible Study (SY 1992–1993, 1993–1994)
Prayer Basics, College Theology (SY 1993–1994)
Human Formation (SY 1998–1999)
Group Processing (SY 1999–2000)

MSGR. ALFONSO BUGAOAN JR., PC (Diocese of Cubao)
Latin (SY 1983–1984 to 1986–1987)
College Theology (SY 1984–1985 to 1986–1987)

MOST REV. FRANCISCO M. DE LEON, MS (Diocese of Antipolo)
Human Relations (SY 1974–1975, 1975–1976)
Latin (SY 1978–1979, 1979–1980, 1981–1982, 1982–1983, 1999–2000, 2000–2001)
Catholic Doctrines (SY 1989–1990, 1990–1991)

MSGR. ADOLFO DEPRA, HP, STh.L, PhD (Diocese of Kalibo)
Ancient and Medieval Philosophy, Logic, Modern Philosophy, Epistemology (SY 1987–1988)

FR. RAMON ELOREAGA (Diocese of Cubao)
Christian Spirituality (SY 1997–1998)
Prayer Basics (SY 1998–1999, 1999–2000)

FR. HENRY FERRERAS, STL (Diocese of Cubao)
Christian Spirituality (SY 1993–1994)
Social Philosophy, Moral Philosophy (SY 1995–1996 to 1997–1998)

MSGR. ERNESTO JOAQUIN, HP (Diocese of Parañaque)
Theodicy, Oriental Philosophy (SY 1975–1976)

FR. JAIME LARA, MA (Diocese of Novaliches)
College Theology, Thesis Writing, Religious Education, Social Doctrines of the Church (SY 1999–2000)

FR. AMBROSIO NONATO LEGASPI, STh.L (Diocese of Novaliches)
Christian Spirituality (SY 1994–1995, 1995–1996)
Prayer Basics (SY 1995–1996)

FR. LEANDRO MAGNAIT JR., STB (Diocese of Kalookan)
Christian Values (SY 1991–1992, 1992–1993, 1997–1998)
Epistemology (SY 1993–1994, 1996–1997 to 1998–1999)
Modern Philosophy (SY 1993–1994, 1994–1995)
History of Philosophy (SY 1995–1996)
Seminary Formation (SY 1995–1996 to 1998–1999)
Introduction to Sacred Scriptures (SY 1998–1999 to 2001–2002)
College Theology (SY 1998–1999)

FR. RAMIL R. MARCOS, MA, STh.L (Diocese of Pasig)
Latin (SY 2001–2002)
Social Doctrines of the Church (SY 2000–2001)

FR. MELCHOR MONTALBO JR., PhD (Diocese of Parañaque)
Cosmology (SY 1987–1988, 1996–1997, 1998–1999
Oriental Philosophy (SY 1987–1988)
History of Philosophy (SY 1988–1989 to 1992–1993)
Epistemology (SY 1988–1989 to 1992–1993, 1995–1996)
Logic, Latin (SY 1989–1990 to 1993–1994)
Theodicy (SY 1991–1992, 1992–1993, 1995–1996 to 1998–1999)
Metaphysics (SY 1988–1989 to 1993–1994, 1995–1996 to 1997–1998, 2002–2003)
Philosophical Anthropology (SY 1993–1994, 1995–1996)
Contemporary Philosophy (SY 1995–1996)
Philosophy of Religion (SY 1995–1996 to 1998–1999, 2002–2003, 2003–2004)
Philosophy of Education (SY 2001–2002)
Thesis Writing (SY 1996–1997)
Introduction to Philosophy (SY 1998–1999)
Philosophical Synthesis (SY 2001–2002)

FR. MEDARDO ONG (Diocese of Kalookan)
Basic Bible Study, Catholic Doctrines (SY 1989–1990)

MOST REV. SEVERINO PELAYO, PhD (Military Ordinariate) (†)
Logic (SY 1977–1978)
Metaphysics (SY 1977–1978 to 1979–1980)
Oriental Philosophy (SY 1977–1978, 1980–1981, 1984–1985 to 1986–1987)
History of Philosophy (SY 1978–1979)
Philosophy of Language (SY 1978–1979, 1980–1981)
Ancient and Medieval Philosophy (SY 1979–1980 to 1986–1987)
Modern Philosophy (SY 1983–1984 to 1986–1987)

FR. ISIDRO D. PUYAT, Ph.L (Diocese of Cabanatuan)
Logic (SY 2007–2008 to present)

MSGR. JESUS-ROMULO C. RAÑADA, PC, PhD, STh.D (Diocese of Novaliches)
Ancient and Medieval Philosophy (SY 1988–1989)
Contemporary Philosophy (SY 1992–1993)
Philosophy of Religion (SY 1992–1993, 1994–1995, 2001–2002)
Social Philosophy, 20th Century Philosophy (SY 1994–1995)
Theodicy (SY 1994–1995, 1999–2000 to 2001–2002)
Cosmology (SY 2000–2001)

FR. ROBERTO REYES, Ph.L (Diocese of Cubao)
Theodicy (SY 1987–1988)
Philosophy of Religion (SY 1988–1990, 1990–1991)
Contemporary Philosophy (SY 1987–1988 to 1990–1991)

MSGR. DANIEL STA. MARIA, PC, MS Ch.E, MBA (Diocese of Cubao)
Algebra (SY 1979–1980)

FR. FERDINAND SANTOS, PhD (Diocese of Cubao)
English (SY 1998–1999)
Philosophy of Science (SY 1998–1999 to 2002–2003)
Logic (SY 1999–2000)
Introduction to Philosophy (SY 1998–1999 to 2003–2004)
Philosophy of Education (SY 2002–2003, 2003–2004)
Epistemology (SY 1999–2000 to 2003–2004)
Theodicy (SY 2002–2003)
Social Doctrines of the Church (SY 1998–1999, 2000–2001 to 2002–2003)
Metaphysics (SY 1999–2000 to 2001–2002)
Oriental Philosophy (SY 1998–1999 to 2001–2002)
Christian Spirituality (SY 2000–2001)

FR. FRANCISCO SIGUAN JR., MA (Diocese of Parañaque)
College Theology, Religious Education, Spiritual Growth (SY 1987–1988)
English (SY 2000–2001)
Group Processing (SY 2000–2001)

FR. ARISTON L. SISON JR., SCSL (Diocese of Cubao)
Audio Visual Techniques, Movie Appreciation (SY 1992–1993, 1993–1994)
Mass Media and the Social Apostolate of the Church (SY 1995–1996 to present)

FR. DENNIS SORIANO (Diocese of Cubao)
Latin (SY 2001–2002 to 2005–2006)

MSGR. RAMON TIRAÑA, HP, Ph.L, STh.L (Diocese of Bacolod) (†)
College Theology (SY 1985–1986, 1986–1987)

FR. JOSE PEREGRINO TOMAS (Diocese of Novaliches)
History of Philosophy (SY 1994–1995, 1995–1996)
Christian Maturity and Living (SY 1994–1995 to 1999–2000)
Catholic Doctrines (SY 1996–1997 to 1998–1999, 2000–2001)
Medieval Philosophy (SY 1996–1997, 1997–1998)
Modern Philosophy (SY 1996–1997)
Solfeggio (SY 1997–1998 to 2001–2002)
College Theology (SY 1999–2000 to 2001–2002)
Seminary Formation (SY 1999–2000)

MOST REV. MYLO HUBERT VERGARA, STh.D (Diocese of San Jose, NE)
College Algebra and Trigonometry (SY 1985–1986)
Philosophical Anthropology (SY 1995–1996, 1997–1998 to 1999–2000)Religious PriestsFR. ERNESTO ARCEO, OP, PhD
Medieval Philosophy (SY 1997–1998)
Salvation History (SY 1998–1999)

FR. SEBASTIAN FRANCISCO BACATAN JR., AM, PhD
Introduction to the Bible (SY 1996–1997, 1997–1998)

FR. VICTOR BADILLO, SJ, PhD
Introduction to the Physical Sciences (SY 1975–1976)
Astronomy (SY 1976–1977 to 1980–1981, 1982–1983 to 1985–1986)

FR. LINO BANAYAD, SJ (†)
Fundamentals of Catechetics (SY 1976–1977 to 1978–1979, 1980–1981)
Religious Education (SY 1981–1982, 1982–1983)

FR. LEON CORNEROTTE, CICM, Ph.L (†)
Cosmology (SY 1974–1975, 1976–1977, 1978–1979 to 1980–1981, 1982–1983 to 1986–1987)
Theodicy (SY 1974–1975, 1976–1977, 1978–1979 to 1986–1987)
Logic (SY 1981–1982 to 1986–1987)
Metaphysics, Epistemology, Philosophy of Religion (SY 1982–1983 to 1986–1987)

FR. NICASIO CRUZ, SJ, MA, STh.L
Audio-Visual Techniques in Evangelization (SY 1979–1980, 1980–1981, 1982–1983 to 1988–1989)

FR. LUIS S. DAVID, SJ, PhD
Contemporary Philosophy (SY 2008–2009 to present)
Modern Philosophy (SY 2009–2010 to present)

FR. GERARD DECAESTECKER, CICM, PhD (†)
Logic, Metaphysics (SY 1974–1975 to 1976–1977)
Epistemology (SY 1974–1975 to 1977–1978)
History of Philosophy (SY 1974–1975 to 1978–1979)

FR. GABRIEL FLORES, RCJ, Ph.L, STh.L
Oriental Philosophy (SY 1997–1998 to 1999–2000)

FR. ENRICO GONZALES, OP, PhD
Philosophy of Science (SY 1997–1998)
Metaphysics (SY 1998–1999)

FR. FELICIANO MANALILI, OCSO
Logic, English (SY 1978–1979, 1979–1980)
Epistemology, Latin (SY 1980–1981)

FR. FRANCIS TE MARVELDE, CICM, MS (†)
Latin (SY 1974–1975, 1977–1978 to 1980–1981, 1982–1983 to 1997–1998)
Religious Psychology (SY 1974–1975 to 1976–1977)
College Theology (SY 1977–1978, 1983–1984, 1984–1985)
Basic Orientation (SY 1978–1980, 1980–1981, 1982–1983)

FR. RODOLFO SICIO, OSA, STL, MA, Ph.B
Advanced Spanish, Philippine Literature in Spanish (SY 1975–1976)

FR. JAN VAN DE STEEN, CICM, MA (†)
Music (SY 1985–1986, 1986–1987)

FR. JOHN ZWAENEPOEL, CICM, PhD (†)
Philosophical Anthropology (SY 1974–1975 to 1977–1978)
History of Philosophy (SY 1974–1975, 1975–1976)
Ethics, Ethical Anthropology (SY 1974–1975 to 1977–1978, 1982–1983 to 1992–1993)
Social Philosophy (SY 1976–1977 to 1980–1981, 1982–1983 to 1992–1993)
20th Century Philosophy (SY 1976–1977, 1977–1978, 1981–1982, 1982–1983 to 1986–1987)
General Psychology (SY 1978–1979 to 1980–1981)
Phenomenological Psychology (SY 1981–1982 to 1992–1993)Religious Brothers and SistersSR. CELINE BELEN, CFIC, BM, MA
Music (SY 1987–1988)

SR. FELICIDAD DACAYANAN, MIC, MS, PhD
Social Encyclicals (SY 1975–1976)

SR. ROSALYN DOROMAL, DC
Religious Education (SY 1982–1983)

SR. ANGELINA FERNANDO, RVM
Music (SY 1992–1993, 1993–1994)

SR. MA. HARRIET HORMILLOSA, SSJ, MA
World Literature (SY 1983–1984)

SR. MILAGROS IBAÑEZ, DSP
Audio-Visual Techniques in Catechetics (SY 1978–1979)

SR. ANGELITA MARAVE, MACE, STh.L
English Grammar and Composition, Catholic Doctrines, Religious Education (SY 1993–1994)
Initiation to the Gospels (SY 1995–1996)

SR. LYDIA PAOLA MARAVE, MACE, PhD
Catholic Doctrines (SY 1991–1992, 1992–1993)
Initiation to the Gospels (SY 1995–1996, 1996–1997)
Thesis Writing (SY 1997–1998, 1998–1999, 2000–2001 to 2004–2005)
Logic (SY 1998–1999, 2000–2001, 2001–2002)

SR. ROCIANA MENDOZA, ICM, MA
Introduction to Biological Sciences (SY 1978–1979)

SR. GRACIANA RAYMUNDO, DC, MA
Music (SY 1974–1975 to 1977–1978, 1981–1982 to 1986–1987)

SR. GEORGINA SANDICO, DC
Religious Education (SY 1982–1983)

SR. MA. LUCIANA SARMIENTO, DSP
Religious Psychology (SY 1979–1980)
Religious Education (SY 1980–1981, 1981–1982)

SR. VICTORIA TERRENATE, SSJ, MA
Trigonometry (SY 1979–1980)

BR. ENRIQUE LAZATIN, FSC, MA
Cosmology, Religious Education (SY 1975–1976)

FRA. JOAQUIN PREYSLER, OSB
Physical Education (SY 1979–1980)Lay Professors'

MRS. SANDRA ABAD SANTOS
Human Values (SY 1997–1998 to 2003–2004)
Christian Values (SY 1998–1999 to 2000–2001)

MR. PERFECTO ABAYAN, PhD (†)
Economics (SY 1993–1994 to 2006–2007)
Sociology (SY 1995–1996 to 2006–2007)
Philippine History (SY 2000–2001)

MS. JO ABERIA
Sociology (SY 1983–1984)

MR. REYNALDO AGUILAR, MA
Filipino (SY 1978–1979 to 1981–1982)

MR. LEOPOLDE ALMONTE, BS
Biology, Zoology (SY 1985–1986)

MRS. NINA ANACLETO
Filipino, Speech (SY 1986–1987)

MRS. MARIBEL MIGUEL-ARARAO, BM
Music (SY 2002–2003 to present)

MRS. CONSUELO ASIS, MS, MAT (†)
Botany (SY 1984–1985)

CAPT. DANILO BAGUIO, PA
Military Science (SY 1995–1996, 1996–1997)

1LT. ALFREDO BAJARO, PA, BSBA
Military Science (SY 1986–1987)

CAPT. ELEODORO BALMATER, PA
Military Science (SY 1984–1985, 1985–1986)

MRS. HERMINIA BALASTIGUE
Mathematics (SY 1980–1981)

MS. MA. LOURDES BERNADETTE BANSON
Human Values (SY 1994–1995, 1995–1996, 1997–1998)

MS. MARIETTA BAUTISTA, MA
Elementary Statistics (SY 1985–1986 to 1988–1989)
Algebra (SY 1986–1987 to 1988–1989)

MRS. JOSEFINA BEJASA
English (SY 2001–2002)

MR. BENJAMIN BERNALES, PhD cand.
General Sociology, Social Problems (SY 1989–1990 to 1993–1994)

MR. YOLANDO BERONQUE, PhD
College Algebra (SY 1980–1981)

MR. CELESTINO BIOCO, MA
Sociology (SY 1982–1983 to 1984–1985)

MS. PAULITA BONIFACIO (†)
Speech and Drama, Oral Interpretation (SY 1987–1988 to 1989–1990)

MS. MARIVIC BONTO-KANE, MA
Psychology (SY 1983–1984 to 1986–1987)

MR. JOSE BOTIN, BS
Introduction to Biological Science (SY 1979–1980)

MRS. LIGLIWA F. CAINDEC
Introduction to Biological Sciences (SY 1980–1981)

MR. CELSO CAINGLET, Ph.L
Ancient Greek and Medieval Philosophy (1998–1999 to present)
Philosophy of Science (SY 2003–2004 to present)

ENGR. MEDWIN CALIWANAGAN
Practical Arts (SY 1995–1996 to 2004–2005)

LTC. VIRGILIO CAPATI, PA
Military Science (SY 1997–1998 to 1999–2000)

MRS. ZINNIA CARIASA-ARCINUE
Psychology, Statistics (SY 1982–1983)

MR. CAMILO CASALS, MPS, MA units
Economics (SY 1989–1990 to 1992–1993)

MR. BENJAMIN CASTILLO, BSE (†)
Physical Education (SY 1975–1976 to 1978–1979)

MRS. MARIFEL CASTRICIONES
Basic Faith Catechism, Challenges of the Philippine Church Today (SY 2009–2010 to present)

MS. HONORINA ROWENA CASTRO, MA units
English Grammar (SY 1994–1995)

MS. JOCELYN CELIS, M.Ed.
Fundamentals of Catechetics (SY 1995–1996)

MRS. DIANA CERDA
English (SY 2000–2001, 2001–2002)

ATTY. JOSE CERVANIA, LL.B, MA
Spanish 1 & 2 (SY 1974–1975)

MRS. GERRIE AN CHENG, MA cand.
General Psychology (SY 1994–1995)

MR. WILSON CHUA, MA
Political Science, Philippine History (SY 1985–1986, 1986–1987)

ATTY. RONY CIRILOS, LLB
Political Science and Rizal (SY 1989–1990 to 1994–1995)
Philippine History (SY 1989–1990)

MS. MA. TERESA CONDE, BSE
English Grammar (SY 1995–1996, 1996–1997)

MRS. FLORENCIA CORPUZ, MA cand.
College Algebra (SY 1994–1995, 1995–1996)

MR. RODRIGO CORPUZ
Physical Education (SY 1985–1986 to present)

MS. MILA CORTEZ, MA
English (SY 1995–1996 to 1997–1998, 1999–2000, 2000–2001)
Self-Discovery, Group Processing (SY 1995–1996 to 1999–2000)

MR. ARSENIO CRISOSTOMO, BM
Music (SY 2000–2001 to present)

MRS. LOURDES DALUPAN, MA
Spanish and English (SY 1975–1976 to 1979–1980)

MS. MARY ANN DALUPAN, MA cand..
Group Dynamics (SY 1990–1991 to 1992–1993)

MS. VISITACION R. DE LA TORRE, MA (Lingui)
English Composition, Philippine Literature, Drama, Poetry (SY 1974–1975)

Mr. JESUS ANGELO DELA CRUZ
Religious Education (SY 2000–2001, 2001–2002, 2002–2003)

MS. KREMHILDA DIDELES, MAT
College Algebra, Physics (SY 1985–1986, 1986–1987)
Earth and Universe, Trigonometry (SY 1986–1987)

MRS. NANETTE GARCIA-DUNGO, PhD
Sociology (SY 2006–2007 to present)
Economics (SY 2007–2008 to present)

MRS. AMY TOLOSA-DUREMDES, MA
Marriage and Family Life (SY 1989–1990)

MRS. NARITA TANCHOCO-ELLAR, MA
General Psychology (SY 1992–1993 to present)
Social Psychology (SY 1992–1993 to 2004–2005)
Self-Discovery, Group Processing (SY 1997–1998)

MRS. BABY CARILLO-ENDAYA
Catechetics (SY 1976–1977 to 1979–1980)

MR. DANIEL ESCASA, BS
Statistics, Trigonometry, Introduction to Biological Sciences, College Algebra (SY 1984–1985)

MRS. NENITA OBAN-ESCASA, Litt.B, MA
English (SY 1981–1982 to 1993–1994, 2002–2003 to present)
Filipino (SY 1984–1985, 1985–1986, 1987–1988, 1988–1989)

MRS. LINDA FABULA, MA
College Algebra, Trigonometry, Statistics (SY 1996–1997 to present)

MR. REYNALDO FAJARDO, MA
Philippine Constitution (SY 1981–1982 to 1984–1985)
Asian History (SY 1983–1984, 1984–1985)

MRS. ALBINA FERNANDEZ, MIR
English (SY 1981–1982, 1982–1983)

MRS. APRICINIA FERNANDEZ, Litt.B
English (SY 1975–1976 to 1979–1980, 1981–1982, 1982–1983)
Sociology (SY 1975–1976 to 1979–1980)

MR. LIGORIO FERNANDEZ, BSE
Laboratory Physics (SY 1974–1975)

MR. PASCUAL FERNANDEZ, BSC
Music (SY 1978–1979)

MRS. GILDA GARBANZOS
General Psychology, Educational Psychology, Developmental Psychology (SY 1980–1981)

MR. JESUS GARCIA, MS
Zoology, Botany (SY 1975–1976, 1976–1977)
Chemistry (SY 1975–1976)

MR. JOSE GARCIA, MA
Audio-Visual Techniques in Evangelization, Movie Appreciation (SY 1989–1990)
Arts (SY 1990–1991)

MS. NIEVES GONZAGA, MS, PhD units
General Psychology, Social Psychology (SY 1986–1987, 1989–1990)

MS. CYNTHIA GREGORIO, PhD Earth and Universe

References

Seminaries and theological colleges in the Philippines
Catholic seminaries
Educational institutions established in 1702
1702 establishments in the Spanish Empire
Catholic universities and colleges in Metro Manila
Education in Makati
Juan Nakpil buildings
Charles Borromeo